Épinay-sur-Duclair is a commune in the Seine-Maritime department in the Normandy region in northern France.

Geography

Population

Places of interest
 St. Martin's church, dating from the sixteenth century.
 A sixteenth-century stone cross.

See also
Communes of the Seine-Maritime department

References

Communes of Seine-Maritime